Clive Barton (born 2 October 1971) is an Australian sport shooter. Barton competed at the 2000 Summer Olympics in the Men's skeet event, in which he tied for 14th place. At the 2012 Summer Olympics he competed in the Men's skeet event as well, finishing in 29th and 35th places on each day of the competition.

References

External links
Australian Olympic Committee

Australian male sport shooters
Living people
1971 births
Olympic shooters of Australia
Shooters at the 2000 Summer Olympics
Shooters at the 2012 Summer Olympics
People from Tamworth, New South Wales
Commonwealth Games medallists in shooting
Commonwealth Games silver medallists for Australia
Commonwealth Games bronze medallists for Australia
Shooters at the 2006 Commonwealth Games
Sportsmen from New South Wales
21st-century Australian people
Medallists at the 2006 Commonwealth Games